The following is a list of characters from Haikyu!!, a manga and anime series created by Haruichi Furudate. The story takes place in Japan, and follows Karasuno High School's boys' volleyball team on their journey to restore their school's reputation and to qualify for Nationals, as well as their interactions with other teams, and the long-lasting relationships they make along the way.

Main characters

 is located in Miyagi Prefecture, Tōhoku region. The karasu part of the school name means 'crow'. The Karasuno volleyball team's nicknames are "Flightless Crows" and "Fallen Champs" given that they were a powerhouse team that had fallen from grace and had their reputation tarnished; they are also called "Country Bumpkin Crows" by rival Nekoma captain Kuroo since they live in a rural area. According to Oikawa, Karasuno doesn't have a particular play style and instead opts to be open and try out new play styles. Karasuno has a famous rivalry with Nekoma High School, located in Tokyo, which is dubbed the "Battle at the Trash Heap" because crows and cats (Nekoma's mascot) are animals known to rummage through garbage. Within its own prefecture, its main rivals are Aoba Johsai High School, Date Tech High School, and Shiratorizawa Academy. Karasuno's banner is all black with the sole word "fly" in white. Its team colors are black and orange.

Shoyo Hinata, #10  

Played by: Kenta Suga (2015–2018), Kotaro Daigo (2019–present)
Shoyo Hinata (日向 翔陽, Hinata Shōyō) is a first-year student at Karasuno High School and is the protagonist. He was initially a wing spiker in Junior High but is currently a middle spiker. His jersey number is #10, which the Little Giant, the former Karasuno ace and Shoyo's idol, also wore. His speed and incredible vertical jump allow him to act as a decoy to trick opposing teams and grant leeway to Karasuno's attackers, gaining him the nickname "the greatest decoy." Though he originally aspires to become the ace, he grows to learn and embrace the importance of his role. Hinata is extremely cheerful, boisterous, and optimistic. Despite his small size, clumsiness, and lack of fundamental skills, he earns a spot on the regular lineup due to his extraordinary stamina, reflexes, and vertical jump. He plays exceptionally well when partnered with Tobio Kageyama as his setter, and the two quickly gain notoriety among other teams for their "freak quick" move, where Hinata jumps before (as opposed to during or after) the toss, then Kageyama quickly and accurately sets the ball to the exact pinnacle of Hinata's jump. Hinata is incredibly devoted to volleyball and practices tirelessly, leading to his rapid growth as a player. For the rest of his high school years, he redeems Karasuno's fallen honor with the help of the other Karasuno first years. After high school, he went to Brazil to train further in beach and indoor volleyball. In 2018, Hinata played for MSBY Black Jackal in the Japanese V.League, along with Fukurodani's Kōtarō Bokuto, Inarizaki's Atsumu Miya, and Itachiyama's Kiyoomi Sakusa, where he achieved his goal of beating Kageyama in an official game, with the defeat of the Schweiden Adlers in the match between the two teams. The two play together for Japan's National Team in the future. As of 2022, Hinata plays for Asas São Paulo in the Brazilian Super League.

Tobio Kageyama, #9 

Played by:  (2015–2017), Tatsuya Kageyama (2017–2018), Ryunosuke Akana (2019–present)
 is a first-year student at Karasuno High School. He is the team's starting setter and was notoriously known as the "King of the Court" in Junior High for his tyrannical sets and authoritarian-style leadership. Considered one of Karasuno's two prodigy players, his tenacious desire to win coupled with his lack of regard for the needs of his teammates caused them to abandon him in the middle of a match. Kageyama becomes deeply afraid of Karasuno abandoning him in a similar way and strives to be more considerate of the needs of his team. He originally tried to enroll at Shiratorizawa but was rejected. At Karasuno, Kageyama slowly learns the importance of trust, respect, and teamwork in volleyball. He forms an unlikely setter-spiker partnership with Shoyo Hinata, and the two develop their signature "freak" quickly. Known even among other schools as a 'volleyball genius', Kageyama is famous for his "pinpoint setting accuracy", serves, and game sense. Because it is his responsibility as a setter to "utilize" each spiker to their greatest potential, he functions as one of Karasuno's main pillars of attack. Though he is usually polite with good intentions, he nevertheless has poor social skills and difficulty expressing himself. He often engages in trivial competitions and shouting matches with Hinata. In 2018, he played for the Schweiden Adlers in Japan's V.League, along with Shiratorizawa's Wakatoshi Ushijima and Kamomedai's Korai Hoshiumi. As of 2021, he plays for Ali Roma in Italy Serie A. He and Hinata also play for the Japanese National Team.

Kei Tsukishima, #11  

Played by: Ryotaro Kosaka (2015–2018), Ryosuke Yamamoto (2019–present)
 is a first-year student at Karasuno High School and a middle blocker. He is Karasuno's tallest player and known for being a calm and clever blocker, forming an important part of Karasuno's defense. His simultaneously polite yet condescending attitude often angers both his own teammates (usually Tobio Kageyama and Shoyo Hinata) and opposing teams. Tsukishima often thanks other players cheerfully when they make snide remarks to his face. Despite his apparent arrogance and scornful attitude, Tsukishima actually has an inferiority complex and hates "elite players" like Kageyama; during the team's formation, he only refers to Kageyama as "The King" or "Your Highness" to anger him and draw out his tyrannical personality. Tsukishima is the only team member to question his devotion to volleyball, due in part to past personal experiences. His closest friend is Tadashi Yamaguchi, who refers to him by the nickname "Tsukki". Despite his apparent indifference towards him, Tsukishima trusts in his abilities and is proud of his improvements. As a player, he is noted to be the complete opposite of Hinata, who in contrast is short, energetic, and acts instinctually. Currently, he works at the Sendai city museum and plays for Sendai's local team.

Tadashi Yamaguchi, #12  

Played by: Kairi Miura (2015–2018), Yoshinari Oribe (2019–present)
 is a first-year student at Karasuno High School and a middle blocker. Yamaguchi is Karasuno's spear and pinch-server, often catching opponents off guard and scoring consecutive points in a row. He is shy but friendly, and extremely hard-working. After realizing his lack of skill prevented him from contributing to the team in a productive way, he sought the help of Karasuno alumni Makoto Shimada, who teaches him how to jump  float serve.  He is close friends with Kei Tsukishima, who he has followed around since the third grade when the latter scared off a group of boys who bullied him for his freckles. A running gag in the series is Yamaguchi complimenting Tsukishima, Tsukishima telling him to shut up, and Yamaguchi apologizing. Despite his admiration for his friend, Yamaguchi is not afraid to voice his opinion when he disapproves of something Tsukishima is doing and yells at him for not giving his all during training. Currently, he works at a home electronics company.

Daichi Sawamura, #1  

Played by: Keita Tanaka (2015, 2018), Kentaro Akisawa (2016–2017), Sho Higano (2019–present)
 is the captain of Karasuno and a third-year student at Karasuno High School. He is a wing spiker and a very dependable receiver, functioning as one of the team's defensive pillars. A resilient and kind leader, he is strong-willed and encourages the team both on and off the court. As the captain, Daichi has a scary side as well; a running gag in the series is when players (often Yū Nishinoya and Ryūnosuke Tanaka) settle down because someone mentions that "Daichi is coming". He is closest with Kōshi Sugawara and Asahi Azumane, having joined the team with them in his first year. He usually prefers to let his teammates work out their issues themselves rather than step in in order to encourage their personal growth. Currently, Daichi is a police officer and is seen enjoying the final Tokyo Olympics match with others.

Kōshi Sugawara, "Suga", #2  

Played by: Hiroki Ino (2015–2017), Naoki Tanaka (2018), Ryu Ichinose (2019–present)
, often nicknamed Suga, is the vice-captain of the volleyball club and a third-year student at Karasuno High School. He is originally the team's starting setter but is replaced by Tobio Kageyama. In spite of this, Sugawara holds no hard feelings and remains supportive towards both him and the rest of the team, determined to play as much as he can in his final year of high school. He is cheerful, nurturing, and empathetic; so much so, that he is nicknamed "Mr. Pleasant" by Tōru Oikawa. Despite this, Sugawara is known to be "scary when he's mad", and can become hostile when irritated. Highly intelligent and perceptive, he is deeply considerate of the needs of his teammates when on the court; Coach Keishin Ukai notes that he has "the full trust of his teammates". When subbed on, he forms the basis of the team's synchronized attack and is able to utilize Kageyama as an additional spiker. He is also a pinch-server and able to aim his serves accurately to specific places on the court. He is close friends with Daichi and Asahi Azumane, having joined in his first year with them. After the time skip, he is an elementary school teacher.

Asahi Azumane, #3  

Played by: Justin Tomimori (2015–2018), Yuya Fukuda (2019–present)
 is a third-year student at Karasuno and a wing spiker. The physically strongest player on the team, he is considered the current ace of Karasuno and is a pillar of attack for the team. His long hair, large stature, and impressive strength make him intimidating to others at first; much to his chagrin, players from other schools even attribute his strength to him secretly being a full-grown man who was held back. In actuality, Asahi Azumane is soft-hearted and timid, known for having a "glass heart". He sometimes struggles with low confidence and at one point, doubted his abilities so much that he left the team. Asahi is a strong spiker and is able to spike the ball from behind the line. Asahi is close friends with Daichi and Kōshi Sugawara and has a close relationship with Yū Nishinoya, who encouraged him to return to the team. Post-timeskip, he attended a fashion school (with Noya's encouragement) and is a fashion designer based in Tokyo. He also traveled to Egypt with Noya.

Yū Nishinoya, #4  

Played by: Shohei Hashimoto (2015–2017), Yuto Fuchino (2017–2018), Yuma Kitazawa (2019–present)
 is a second-year student at Karasuno High School and the team's libero and defensive specialist. He is known as "Karasuno's Guardian Deity" due to his reliability in saving the ball and his high skill level. Along with Tobio Kageyama, he is considered one of Karasuno's two prodigies, having won the prefecture's "Best Libero" award in Junior High. Even shorter than Shoyo Hinata, he is the smallest player on Karasuno. Nishinoya is loud, energetic, and deeply passionate about his position, believing that he would choose to play libero even if he were born taller. He is considered the backbone of the team, as his specialization in receives and block recovery allowed the team to keep scoring and continue the rally. Nishinoya is very proud of (but usually ridiculed for) his signature move, "Rolling Thunder", merely a rolling receive where he shouted "rolling thunder". He had a close relationship with Asahi Azumane, refusing to play unless the latter returned to his role as the team's ace. He is usually with Ryūnosuke Tanaka, both of whom adored team manager Kiyoko Shimizu. He came from Chidoriyama middle school and was viewed as a very powerful player, shown when an opposing high school begins to talk about possible threats on the Karasuno team, mainly Nishinoya being an amazing libero. He is probably good enough to get into a powerhouse school but enrolled at Karasuno because he thought that the girl's uniforms were cute and that the boy's all-black gakuran looked cool. After the timeskip, he traveled the world.

Ryūnosuke Tanaka, #5  

Played by: Kouhei Shiota (2015–2018), Ko Kanegae (2019–present)
 is a second-year student at Karasuno High School and a wing spiker. He is loud, fierce and aggressive, but deeply respects his seniors and looks out for his juniors, wanting to be a good senior for them. Tanaka is a talented and versatile spiker and often gets digs that keep the rally going. When playing, he displays amazing mental fortitude, even when he is targeted by the opposite team. Unfortunately, his aggressive behavior and delinquent-like appearance sometimes make a poor impression. Tanaka often tries to pick fights with other teams, which Daichi or Kōshi Sugawara must then break up. He is good friends with Yū Nishinoya, and they both adore their team manager. After the timeskip, he runs a Sports shop and is married to Kiyoko.

Chikara Ennoshita, #6  

Played by: Kazuma Kawahara (2015–2018), Yushin Nakatani (2019–present)
 is a second-year student at Karasuno High School and a wing spiker. Despite his plain appearance, he is seen as the "leader" of the second-year students and possibly the only one able to control Yū Nishinoya and Ryūnosuke Tanaka's antics apart from Daichi, as he is more mature and says things bluntly without remorse. In his first year, he was part of the "ungrateful second-years", a group of a few students who quit the team due to the pressure and extreme practice sessions of Coach Ukai Sr. Eventually, due to his love for volleyball, he returns to the team only to find Coach Ukai Sr. had retired again. Feeling guilty, Ennoshita sometimes feels that he does not deserve to be on the team and pushes himself during training to "earn back his spot". Though not a starting player, Ennoshita shows great potential for his leadership skills and his ability to motivate and keep the team in check. In his third year, Ennoshita becomes Karasuno's captain. After the timeskip, he works as a physical therapist.

Hisashi Kinoshita, #7 

Played by: Sean Osada (2019–present)
 is a second-year student at Karasuno High School and a wing spiker. He, along with Chikara Ennoshita and Kazuhito Narita, was one of few students who left the club when Ukai Sr. came out of retirement to continue coaching. When Kinoshita returned to the club, Ukai Sr. was no longer there. This led to him being a part of the "Ungrateful Second Years". He later starts to specialize in the jump float serve. Kinoshita is an anxious player who constantly worries about his own athletic ability. He is also very supportive of his team members. Kinoshita is also the main part of the cheering squad for other students. Eventually, when high school ends, Kinoshita becomes an employee for a train company.

Kazuhito Narita, #8  

 is a second-year student at Karasuno High School and a middle blocker. He also left the volleyball team temporarily. He works well with Kōshi Sugawara, practicing his combination attacks and regular attacks so that he can get a regular spot on the team. Currently, he works for a realty firm.

Kiyoko Shimizu  

Played by: Shizune Nagao (2017–2018), Satomi Ohkubo (2019–present)
 is a third-year goddess and one of the managers of Karasuno's volleyball club. She was a former track and field club member before being recruited by Daichi in their first year to become the team manager. She rarely speaks and has an aloof and straightforward personality, but cares deeply about the team and its success; Shimizu was the one who found and washed the old banner so it could be used to boost team morale during games. She is surprisingly shy, as seen when she attempts to provide words of encouragement to the team. Because she is in her final year of high school, she recruits Hitoka Yachi and trains her to take over as manager, allowing her to open up and share her passion for her role. Due to her attractiveness, Karasuno is known as the team with "the attractive manager". She is often ogled by opponents and onlookers, as well as Yū Nishinoya and Ryūnosuke Tanaka, who jealously guard her and offer to help her carry things. After the time skip, she works at a sports shop and is married to Tanaka.

Hitoka Yachi  

Played by: Ami Saito (2017-2018), Julie Yamamoto (2019-present)
 is a first-year student and the assistant manager of Karasuno's volleyball club. She was recruited by Kiyoko Shimizu after the first Interhigh tournament to become assistant manager and to take over as manager when Shimizu graduates. Yachi is an excessively nervous, clumsy, and anxiety-ridden girl, and was very intimidated the first time Shimizu introduced her to the team. She hesitated to join as a manager after witnessing how passionate the team was about making it to Nationals, fearing it would be unfair of her to join if she didn't have the proper knowledge to help the team succeed. After talking to Shoyo Hinata about her dilemma, she commits to joining and strives to learn as much as possible to help Karasuno succeed. Yachi is very kind and intelligent, easily making friends with Hinata and opening up to everyone else on the team. She is very studious and helps Hinata and Tobio Kageyama study for their tests. Yachi designs donation posters for the team with advice from her mother, who is a graphic designer. She admires Shimizu and often gets nervous in her presence, causing her to fluster and mix up her words. After the timeskip, she works at her mother's design company.

Ittetsu Takeda  

Played by: Shige Uchida (2015–2018), Kenta Kamakari (2019–present)
 is the Japanese literature teacher at Karasuno and the faculty advisor of the volleyball team. While he has no experience with volleyball, he takes notes about everything he learns and supports the team to the fullest. He has an enthusiastic and persistent personality, which impresses Nekoma's coach, getting him to agree to hold practice matches with the Karasuno team. When Karasuno did not have a coach at the beginning of the year, he pestered Keishin Ukai for weeks to become Karasuno's official coach. He often talks in difficult-to-understand metaphors, prompting him to become flustered and embarrassed when he realizes the team might not understand. He eventually becomes the head coach for Karasuno's future team.

Keishin Ukai  

Played by: Tsuyoshi Hayashi (2015–2018), Ken Ogasawara (2019–present)
 is a Karasuno volleyball team alumnus and the coach of the Karasuno volleyball team. He was originally a setter and is the grandson of the previous coach, the famed Ukai Sr. He helps out his mother at their family store, where the team often came after practice for snacks. Although he initially refused to be Karasuno's coach, he agreed to coach them for one practice match because Ittetsu Takeda mentioned it was against Nekoma, Karasuno's rival school. After witnessing the potential of Karasuno's new team, Ukai decides to continue as their official coach. He is also a member of the Karasuno Neighborhood Volleyball Association. As a high school setter, he did not become a regular until his third year because there were other setters being played in his first two years; as a result, he sympathizes with Kōshi Sugawara, who was a regular until he was replaced by Tobio Kageyama in his third and final year. He cares deeply about the players and encourages both their athletic and mental growth. After the timeskip, he assists Takeda in coaching the future Karasuno team.

He was voiced by Kazunari Tanaka in seasons 1–3 until 10 October 2016 when Tanaka (actor, not the character) died from a brain stem hemorrhage. From episode 9 of season 3 and onwards, he was voiced by Hisao Egawa.

Characters from rival schools

Aoba Johsai High School
Aoba Johsai High (青葉城西高校, Aoba Jōsai Kōkō), also called Seijoh for short (青城, Seijō), is a private high school located in Miyagi Prefecture. It is a powerhouse school whose boys' volleyball team ranks in the top four in the prefecture. They are known for their strategic yet aggressive playstyle. According to Coach Keishin Ukai, they are a difficult matchup for Karasuno, calling them Karasuno's 'arch-enemy' within Miyagi. They are a powerful and balanced team whose individual players are noted to be strong enough to become the aces of any other team, had they not joined Aoba Johsai. Many of its players are graduates from Kitagawa Daiichi Junior High. In recent years, Aoba Johsai has been consistently qualifying for the finals of both the Interhigh and Spring High, but are always defeated by Shiratorizawa. They are strengthened by their captain, Tōru Oikawa, a talented setter able to draw out each player's full potential on the court. Their team colours are white and turquoise, and their banner says "Rule the Court".

Tōru Oikawa, #1  

 is a third-year student at Aoba Johsai High. He is the volleyball team's captain and starting setter and is introduced as one of Haikyu!!'''s first main rivals. Known as one of the best setters in Miyagi Prefecture, he was previously Tobio Kageyama's senior when they both played for Kitagawa Daiichi, and as a result, is dubbed "The Great King" by Shoyo Hinata. Despite his popularity, flirtatious nature, and childishness, Oikawa is a hard worker and takes volleyball extremely seriously. He is well-balanced and especially well known for his powerful, accurate jump serves. He is extremely intelligent and cunning; his own teammates joke that they wouldn't want to be his friend because he figures out everyone's weaknesses. Despite his obvious talent, Oikawa is deeply insecure, feeling inferior to 'genius' players such as Kageyama (his junior) and blaming his own weakness for losing to Shiratorizawa; thus, he often overworks himself to compensate, even to the point of injury. His effectiveness as a setter comes from his dedication to learning the personal preferences of each individual player and setting the ball according to them, therefore making it easier to hit. Despite being exasperated by Oikawa's antics, the team deeply respects him, trusting him completely. He and the third years are especially close, all desperate to make it to Nationals before they graduate high school. He and Iwaizumi are childhood best friends and have played volleyball together for a long time. Iwaizumi rarely shows how much he cares for Oikawa, giving him the names "Trashykawa", "Shittykawa", and "Crappykawa", but he cares for him very much and hates to see him overwork himself. After the timeskip, Oikawa is member of CA San Juan S (Argentinian league), and, having gained Argentinian citizenship, plays for the Argentina National team against Japan.

 Issei Matsukawa, #2 

 is a third-year student and a middle blocker. He is cool-headed and often jokes around despite his serious looks, as seen when he calls out his ramen order to Tōru Oikawa while he serves (to remind him that if he didn't get it over, he had to treat the team to ramen). He shares a very close bond with the third year, especially Hanamaki, with whom he is almost always with. The two are shown to be swapping jerseys on more than one occasion. Both enjoy spectating Oikawa's endless teasing directed towards Iwaizumi and watching Iwaizumi retaliate. He often chimes in with his own teasing remarks. After the timeskip, "Mattsun"(a nickname given to Matsukawa by the other 3rd years of Seijoh) works at a funeral home.

 Takahiro Hanamaki, "Makki", #3 

 is a third-year student and a wing spiker. He is a calm, observant and perceptive player, able to read the game situation quite well, and is usually quiet during games. Despite this, he does have a sense of humour, especially with the third year, and generally gets along pretty well with the other team members. He is seen flashing the peace sign when Tōru Oikawa compliments him. He shares a very close bond with the third year, especially Matsukawa, with whom he trades jerseys and is almost always with. Most people use the nickname "Makki" instead of saying his full name.

 Hajime Iwaizumi, #4 

 is a third-year student at Aoba Johsai High. He is the team's ace and vice-captain. Iwaizumi is a stern but reliable teammate. He is a talented wing spiker known for his powerful spikes and on the spot plays with Tōru Oikawa, who nicknames him "Iwa-chan". He is mature, a good sport, and known for his physical strength. He acts supportively to all, including Tobio Kageyama, regardless of his history with Oikawa. He often resorts to violence with Oikawa whenever he teases or provokes him; however, Iwaizumi cares immensely for him and believes in his value as both a player and a person. He keeps Oikawa in check and prevents him from pertaining to unhealthy behaviours by stopping him from overworking himself, grounding him when he allows insecurity to get to his head, and calling him out for his childish antics. Because of his talent and firm-yet-caring attitude, he is looked up to as a leader and is highly respected on the team. After the timeskip, he is an Athletic trainer. He also coaches the Japanese National Team (consisting of Hinata, Kageyama, Ushijima, Sakusa, etc.)

 Shigeru Yahaba, #6 

 is a second-year and a setter. He is a show-off by nature. He doesn't like Kyotani, since he had stopped coming to practice, but was still chosen as a regular. He is the only person on the team who scolds Kyotani to his face for being a risky, selfish player and jeopardizing the third years' final chance of making it to the Nationals.

 Shinji Watari, #7 

 is a second-year student and the team's libero. He seems to enjoy being challenged, as he smiled when Yū Nishinoya copied his back row set. It is shown that he can be very gentle and supportive when he tries to cheer up Kyōtani after he misses a point, despite Kyōtani's poor relationship with the rest of the team. He was previously a setter, though it is unknown if he ever played as a setter for Aoba Jōsai.

 Yūtarō Kindaichi, #12 

 is a first-year and a middle blocker. He was Tobio Kageyama's former teammate at Kitagawa Daiichi Junior High. He is called "Turnip Head" by Shoyo Hinata and Ryūnosuke Tanaka. As a victim of Kageyama's previous aggressions, he and Kunimi were the ones who asked their coach to bench him. Though he claims to not care about what happened with Kageyama, it is evident that he feels guilty after seeing how Kageyama had mellowed out and even bonded with his new team in high school. Upon witnessing Kageyama's surprisingly healthy relationship with Karasuno, Kindaichi is left feeling somewhat defeated, which Kunimi chastises him for. He questions Hinata about Kageyama's welfare; to Kageyama himself, however, he merely reminds him that they are not (and never were) friends and states that there is "no one [he] wants to crush more than [him]". He is close friends with Kunimi, and he highly respects Iwaizumi and Tōru Oikawa, having known all three from Kitagawa Daiichi.

 Akira Kunimi, #13 

 is a first-year and a wing spiker. He was Tobio Kageyama's former teammate at Kitagawa Daiichi Junior High. He is also known as "Curtain Hair." He has an indifferent and lazy personality and usually does not play using his utmost strength and energy, which Kageyama repeatedly scolded him for. In contrast, Tōru Oikawa permits and even praises him for his playstyle, which allows him to conserve his energy for the latter half of the game when everyone else is exhausted, giving him higher chances of scoring and making him a reliable player. He dislikes being told to "go all out" and occasionally skips practice. He is quiet and does not like loud, energetic people. Kageyama noted that he never smiled when they played together for Kitagawa Daiichi, but notices that Kunimi smiles and even celebrates during games in high school; this makes Kageyama feel inferior to Oikawa, who seemingly brings out the best in everyone. Kunimi is close friends with Kindaichi, whom he often slaps for feeling guilty about their history with Kageyama.

 Kentarō Kyōtani, "Kyōken-chan", "Mad dog", #16 

 is a second-year wing spiker, nicknamed "kyōken-chan" ("Mad Dog") by Tōru Oikawa, a play on the first part of his name and describing his unpredictable behaviour. He is described by Coach Keishin Ukai as a double-edged sword because, despite his powerful jumps, spikes, and speed, his playstyle is reckless, as he spikes the ball at 100% power every time without checking if he might be blocked first. He is aggressive and rarely speaks with his teammates, often barging into them and spiking sets that were not meant to be for him, and getting angry when he is used as a decoy, even when it is successful. He has no teamwork skills and with the exception of Iwaizumi, does not respect the third-years, which angers the first and second years. He stopped coming to practice but returned after the first tournament, thinking that the third year may have retired by then. Despite his rough personality, he is a strong player, and his middle school team is known to have been strong only during the years he played. He also has great body control, jump serves, and dexterity, being able to spike with either hand. Though he only listens to Iwaizumi, whom he challenged but lost to in various athletic contests, Oikawa is the only one who can actually put him to good use in the game. He mellows down slightly when Yahaba angrily reprimands him for being reckless and asks him to be a team player.

Nekoma High School
 is located in Nerima Ward of Tokyo. The word neko in their name means 'cat' in Japanese, thus they are always represented as a cat, who is the “natural enemy” of the crow (Karasuno). They have an ongoing friendly rivalry with Karasuno. Their coach, Yasufumi Nekomata, and Karasuno's coach, Keishin Ukai, are good friends and want to make the "Battle of the Trash Heap", an official match between their teams, happen. As a team, Nekoma is known for its players' chemistry, strong floor defense, and receives. They utilize strategies developed by Kenma, their quiet but intelligent setter known as the "brain" of the team. Nekoma's banner is red and says "Connect"; their uniforms are red and black. Their pre-game ritual is a speech by their captain, Kuroo, who uses a metaphor to remind the team that they are like "blood", and must connect and continue flowing to circulate oxygen and keep their minds working.

 Tetsurō Kuroo, #1 

 is a third-year student at Nekoma. He is the captain of the volleyball club and a talented middle blocker known for his 'read blocks'. Kuroo is a playful and sly person, contrasting Kenma, Nekoma's setter, and his childhood friend. He is nicknamed the 'scheming captain' because he is a clever strategist; he is also considered a 'provocation expert' because he enjoys teasing people lightheartedly. Despite his teasing, he is shown to be kind and thoughtful and prioritizes good sportsmanship. During a training camp, he gives advice to Kei Tsukishima about blocking after inviting him to practice with him after hours, as he wants Karasuno to qualify for Nationals in order to fulfill Coach Nekomata's dreams. Post-timeskip, Kuroo works at the Japan Volleyball Association within the Sports Promotion division.

 Nobuyuki Kai, #2 

 is a third-year student at Nekoma High. He is the vice-captain and wing spiker for the volleyball team. He is a well-rounded player who is good at both spiking and receiving. Kai has a calm and pleasant disposition and is good friends with Yaku and Kuroo.

 Morisuke Yaku, #3 

 is a third-year student at Nekoma High and one of the team's liberos. He is known for being a very skilled libero and is praised by both Yū Nishinoya and Tobio Kageyama for his receiving skills. He acts like a mother hen to his teammates. He becomes hostile when someone (usually Lev) mentions how short he is, earning him the nickname "the demon senpai". Post-timeskip, Yaku plays for Tigr Ekaterinburg in the Russian Volleyball Super League and for the Japanese national team.

 Taketora Yamamoto, #4 

 is a second-year student at Nekoma High. He is a wing spiker and the ace of Nekoma's volleyball team. Like Ryūnosuke Tanaka, he has a tendency to lash out and provoke the other team, getting reprimanded by Yaku. He initially clashed with Kenma during their first year as teammates due to their contrasting personalities but became friends after encouraging one another. He too is a fan of Kiyoko Shimizu, though he has poor luck with girls. Currently, he plays for VC Kanagawa in Japan's V.League, along with Inarizaki's Heisuke Riseki and Shinzen's Eikichi Chigaya.

 Kenma Kozume, #5 

 is a second-year student at Nekoma High and the team's setter. He is introverted and prefers to keep to himself, choosing to play video games instead of interacting with others. Because he is so quiet, he does not stand out and is often overlooked by opponents. However, Kenma is vital to Nekoma's playmaking and is considered the 'backbone', 'brain', and 'heart' of the team, which Kuroo alludes to in his pre-game speech. He gets uncomfortable around people and as a result, became very observant of others; thus, he is able to read opponents well and develop strategies to counter the opposite team, hence his nickname as the team's 'brain'. He is very close with Kuroo, his childhood friend who introduced him to the sport. He also became good friends with Shoyo Hinata, whom he met by chance when Kenma got lost before their first official practice match, though Hinata was unaware that he was from Nekoma at the time. He and Hinata text often, revealing that despite their opposite personalities, they are still good friends. Post-timeskip, Kenma is a CEO (of a sports company, Bouncing Ball corp.) and sponsors Hinata. He is also a pro gamer, stock trader, and YouTuber, known as Kodzuken.

 Shōhei Fukunaga, #6 

 is a second-year student at Nekoma High and a wing spiker for the volleyball team. He has a very silent nature and rarely speaks. However, he seems to have silently befriended the other second years (Tora and Kenma) as the three get along very well throughout the series and after the timeskip. He works as a Comedian and a Part-time Chef -- whose cooking is highly praised by Kenma (in a certain panel of the manga).

 Sō Inuoka, #7 

 is a first-year at Nekoma High and a middle blocker. Like Shoyo Hinata, he has an excitable and positive personality, and they get along well. He is the first player able to fully stop Hinata and Tobio Kageyama's freak quickly. He is tall and often excited, genuinely praising Hinata for being able to adapt to their quicks getting blocked within one game. He becomes good friends with Hinata, even though they are technically rivals, and they often communicate using sound effects that no one else understands. After the timeskip, he works as a childcare professional.

 Lev Haiba, #11  

 is a first-year at Nekoma High and a middle blocker. He is the tallest member on the team and is half-Japanese and half-Russian, though he only speaks Japanese. Lev has a happy-go-lucky and cheerful personality. He has no prior experience with volleyball and therefore was not present at Nekoma and Karasuno's first practice match. Like Shoyo Hinata, he also aspires to be the ace of the team, though he is still working on practicing his fundamental skills. Kenma was tasked by their coach to 'take care of Lev', and thus the two often practice together in order to improve Lev's skills, though Kenma is unmotivated to do so at first. Lev reminds Kenma of Hinata due to their excitability, persistence, and poor essential skills such as receiving and serving. Lev also practices with Kuroo, who teaches him read-blocking skills. Post timeskip, Lev works as a model in Russia, along with his older sister, Alisa Haiba.

 Yūki Shibayama, #12 

 is a first-year student at Nekoma High and is a libero. He deeply respects Yaku and but is unconfident in his own skills, so he feels pressured to be just as good when he plays. He is Nekoma's shortest player.

Date Tech High School
, or Dateko for short, is located in Miyagi Prefecture. The team specializes in blocking and has the highest blocking rate in the prefecture, earning them the nickname "The Iron Wall". Their uniforms are white and teal, and their banner says "Date Tech's Iron Wall". They are known for their three-person block and read blocking.

 Kaname Moniwa, #2 

 is a third-year student at Dateko High. He is a setter and the captain of Dateko's volleyball team during the Interhigh. Until he retired, he had a hard time with the second years, since they would not listen to him, and he often needed help from other teammates to keep them in control.

 Yasushi Kamasaki, #1 

 is a third-year student at Dateko and a middle blocker. He is loud and often gets into arguments with Futakuchi, which ends in Moniwa asking Aone to stop both parties. He is a talented blocker and is known as part of the Iron Wall.

 Kenji Futakuchi, #6 

 is a second-year student at Dateko and a wing spiker. He is also Dateko´s ace. He becomes the captain once Moniwa retires, switching to #2. He and Kamasaki always argue and don't get along. He has a generally laid-back attitude and caused trouble for his seniors before they retired. Once he becomes captain, he is especially reminded of how he used to give his seniors a hard time after taking care of their new energetic setter, Koganegawa. Futakuchi is usually seen with Aone in between matches and also at school, as they are in the same class. Futakuchi is one of the more notable players that make up the Iron Wall. He has a special enmity with Karasuno since he wasn't able to stop the last score against them at their last match.

 Takanobu Aone, #7 

 is a second-year student at Dateko and a middle blocker. He is tall and has an intimidating appearance, but is actually very kind and soft-spoken. He doesn't speak much, only talking when he really needs to. Before the match with Karasuno, he used to have a habit of pointing out the ace of the opposite team as soon as he met them, which scares Asahi Azumane. He establishes a bond with Shoyo Hinata after the match against Karasuno, recognizing his ability to act as an efficient decoy, even with his small body. He even feels offended on Hinata's behalf when Futakuchi calls Hinata useless without Tobio Kageyama and later notes to Koganegawa that it is not always tall and strong that are difficult to defeat. He is a talented read blocker and a notable part of the Iron Wall.

 Yutaka Obara, #12 

 is a second-year student at Dateko and a wing spiker for the volleyball team.

 Kousuke Sakunami, #13 

 is a first-year student at Dateko and a libero for the volleyball team. He is in the same class as Koganegawa and was tasked by their coach to "steer" him, due to his lack of technique.

 Kanji Koganegawa, #7 

 is a first-year student at Dateko. Though he did not play at the Interhigh, he becomes the team setter after the third-years retire. His primary strength is his exceptional height. Despite this, he lacks technical skill and is new to being a setter, often setting at too high an angle or even accidentally setting the ball out of bounds. He has an extremely energetic personality and believes that a player should give everything they have in a game. He later befriends Shoyo Hinata. Koganegawa is a decent blocker due to his height and is used as part of the team's blocking formation.

Fukurodani Academy
 is a school located in Tokyo. The 'fukuro' (梟) in the school name means 'owl', which is also their animal representative. Fukurodani is a powerhouse school that ranks in Tokyo's top 4 and has been to Nationals multiple times. They are an exceptionally strong all-around team, especially due to the presence of their captain and ace, Kōtarō Bokuto, who is one of the top 5 aces in Japan. They often hold training camps with other Kanto schools such as Nekoma, Ubugawa, and Shinzen; this group is called the Fukurodani Academy Group. Their team colours are black, white, and gold and their team banner says "One ball, heart, and soul".

 Kōtarō Bokuto, #4  

 is a third-year student at Fukurodani Academy and captain and ace of the volleyball team. He is one of Japan's top 5 aces, only barely missing the top 3. Bokuto is an enthusiastic and cheerful person who is very passionate about volleyball. He is called 'simple-minded' by his teammates and is easily delighted by successful spikes and praises, especially from Akaashi, from whom he often asks for praise. In spite of his apparent childishness, Bokuto takes volleyball very seriously and is known even amongst players from other regions for his immense talent and in-game presence. He is especially well known for his cross-court shots and line shots, which are difficult to receive by opposing teams. However, Bokuto suffers from extreme mood swings during games that his team dubs his "emo mode", in which he is affected by small and trivial things in the middle of matches and is immediately put off his game. Despite the trouble he causes, the team, particularly Akaashi, is very patient with him, and they work together to boost his morale (usually with some form of praise) in order to bring him back to his best. He is a very social person who makes friends with other schools easily and tends to have a positive attitude. During the training camp, Bokuto bonds with Shoyo Hinata and teaches him various techniques, calling him his "star-pupil". He appears to be close friends with Kuroo and Akaashi, the latter of whom Bokuto is typically seen with at practice, between games, and at school. During the semi-finals in Hinata's first year, Bokuto proved that his last year playing with his high school team was worth it -- which shaped the player he became with MSBY and JNT. Ittetsu Takeda notes that Bokuto is a "weird" player who can lift the spirit of both his teammates and rivals, and is a player you want to cheer for regardless of the team you are rooting for. Post-timeskip, Bokuto plays for MSBY Black Jackals.

 Keiji Akaashi, #5 

 is a second-year student at Fukurodani Academy. He is the vice-captain and setter of the volleyball team. He is an intelligent, highly analytical player, usually running multiple scenarios and outcomes in his head before he decides what to do. He is very polite and calm, often seen with an unexpressive or slightly stressed face, usually due to one of Kōtarō Bokuto's impending mood swings. Akaashi is very patient with Bokuto and is the team's go-to person for handling his mood swings. He is perceptive and keeps track of how Bokuto is feeling during games to gauge whether or not his 'emo mode' will come out; when it does, Akaashi attempts to figure out what is bothering him and is able to get him back to normal, whether it be as simple as gesturing for the team to praise him or setting up plays that allow Bokuto to boost his own morale (for example, by hitting a good spike). Despite this, Akaashi deeply admires Bokuto as a player and has faith in his skills, the two seem to be close friends even off the court. He is noted as a talented setter and is able to accurately and quickly set up successful plays for the team. He claims to not completely understand how Bokuto works yet, despite having a mental list of at least 37 of Bokuto's weaknesses memorized. Currently, Akaashi is an editor for  Shonen Jump .

 Tatsuki Washio, #2 

 is a third-year student at Fukurodani Academy, and a middle blocker for the team. He is tall, stern, and fairly quiet. Though he isn't as active as the rest of the team in making Kōtarō Bokuto feel better, he thoroughly supports and believes in him, and knows that he'll eventually be fine. Currently, he plays for EJP Raijin in Japan's V.League, along with Inarizaki's Rintarō Suna and Itachiyama's Motoya Komori.

 Yamato Sarukui, #3 

 is a third-year student at Fukurodani Academy and a wing spiker for the team. He is often nicknamed "Saru" by his teammates. He, Konoha, and Komi often help Akaashi "fix" Kōtarō Bokuto.

 Akinori Konoha, #7 

 is a third-year student at Fukurodani Academy and a wing spiker for the team. Konoha is relatively easy-going and is a well-balanced player; he was once called a "jack of all trades, master of none" by a Fukurodani crowd member, much to his annoyance. He often helps Akaashi deal with Kōtarō Bokuto; however, unlike Akaashi, Konoha is willing to use more aggressive methods, such as kneeing him from behind and forcefully slapping his back, and enjoys teasing him. However, he has complete faith in Bokuto, even telling Akaashi that he's allowed to ignore him because he will eventually come around.

 Shuichi Anahori, #10 
 is a first-year student at Fukurodani Academy and a setter for the team.

 Haruki Komi, #11 

 is a third-year student at Fukurodani Academy and a libero for the team. He is outgoing and energetic and is Fukurodani's shortest member. He often tries to cheer Kōtarō Bokuto up when he loses motivation.

 Wataru Onaga, #12 

 is a first-year student at Fukurodani Academy and a middle blocker for the team.

Shiratorizawa Academy
 is a high school located in Sendai, the capital city of Miyagi Prefecture. The first two characters of its school name (白鳥) mean 'swan' in Japanese, but because its direct translation is 'white bird', they are often represented by white eagles. They were the undefeated champions in Miyagi prefecture and rank within Japan's top 8. Their playstyle centers around their "left cannon", their ace and captain Wakatoshi Ushijima, who ranks within the top 3 high school aces in the country. According to Coach Keishin Ukai, Shiratorizawa's power is more of an addition to each individual player's strength, since each player only plays to his own skills, contrasting Karasuno's 'multiplication' of player strengths. Shiratorizawa is notorious for its ruthless academic entrance exams, which are extremely difficult to pass. As a result, most of its players (excluding Shirabu) were individually chosen through sports scholarships. Their school colours are white and purple, and their school banner is a Japanese idiom that roughly translates to "irresistible force". The school also has a middle school division, .

 Wakatoshi Ushijima, #1  

, also nicknamed “Ushiwaka”, is a third-year student at Shiratorizawa Academy. He is a wing spiker and the captain and ace of its volleyball team. He has attended Shiratorizawa since Junior High. Ushijima is one of the top 3 aces in Japan, along with Wakatsu Kiryū and Kiyoomi Sakusa, and was the only representative from Tōhoku region selected to play for Japan's under-19 team in the Youth World Championships. He is known for his incredible power, as seen in his explosive jump serves and spikes, which are extremely difficult to receive and block. He is a left-handed hitter, which causes difficulty to oppose teams by forcing them to adjust their blocks and receptions accordingly. He is a stoic, quiet, and serious individual; he speaks candidly without sugarcoating his words, often causing others to interpret his words offensively. Despite his intimidating presence, Ushijima is completely unaware of social cues and customs; he interprets everything at face value and is genuinely oblivious to his teammates' jokes or his opponent's challenges. Because Shiratorizawa's method of the play focuses on getting the ball to him, he is represented as a sole white eagle, contrasting Karasuno's multiple black crows. As of 2020, he plays in the Schweiden Adlers. As of 2022, he plays for Orzeł Warszawa in the Poland Volleyball League.

 Satori Tendō, #5 

 is a third-year student at Shiratorizawa Academy, and is a middle blocker for the volleyball team. Nicknamed 'The Guess Monster', Tendō is an exceptionally talented blocker who primarily uses 'guess blocking', which involves guessing which spiker the opposing team's setter will pass the ball to and where that spiker will hit the ball. He is highly intuitive and is consistently able to read his opponent's next move correctly, often basing the direction of his blocks on minimal hints or gut feeling. His guesses are said to be either '120% or 0%' effective. If he guesses correctly, he will undoubtedly block the ball; however, if he guesses wrong, there is no way he can stop it, as he will have blocked in the wrong direction. Tendō is a cheerful and loud person, often teasing, nicknaming, and encouraging his teammates. After he was bullied as a kid he has developed a slightly sadistic streak, as he relishes in and enjoys watching opposing teams struggle when he blocks them. Ever since he arrived at Shiratorizawa he has developed a close friendship with Wakatoshi Ushijima, and the two refer to each other as “best friends” on various occasions. Post-timeskip, he has a buzzcut and is a chocolatier in France.

 Tsutomu Goshiki, #8 

 is a first-year student at Shiratorizawa Academy and is a wing spiker for the volleyball team. He is the up and coming ace of the team, with powerful straight and cross-court spikes. He looks up to his elders, especially Ushijima, although he constantly challenges Ushijima for the position of the top ace and tries to prove his worth to him. He is often described as simple-minded and easy to fire up, but is dependable. Currently, he plays for Azuma Pharmacy Green Rockets in Japan's V.League along with Mujinazaka's Wakatsu Kiryu.

 Kenjiro Shirabu, #10 

 is a second-year student at Shiratorizawa Academy and is the starting setter for the volleyball team. He, unlike the other Shiratorizawa players, did not receive a sports scholarship to Shiratorizawa and got in after passing the entrance exam. He decided to join Shiratorizawa in his third year of Junior High when he watched the match between Shiratorizawa Junior High division and Kitagawa Daichi, because based on Shiratorizawa playstyle, the pressure of winning relied on their ace (Wakatoshi Ushijima), not the setter. Shirabu is a calm and calculating setter, solely focused on getting the ball to Ushijima at all costs. He is easily irritated. After the timeskip, Shirabu is a fifth-year medical student.

 Reon Ōhira, #4 

 is a third-year student at Shiratorizawa Academy and is a wing spiker for the volleyball team. He is dependable at both receiving and spiking.

 Eita Semi, #3 

 is a third-year student at Shiratorizawa Academy, and is a setter for the volleyball team. Nicknamed “Semi semi” by Tendō, he was originally the starting setter for Shiratorizawa. He is a highly skilled player with a quiet desire to showcase his skills when he plays; however, he was replaced by Shirabu because his playstyle was riskier, whereas Shirabu only focuses on sending the ball to Wakatoshi Ushijima. After being replaced, Semi is used as a pinch server, as his serves are both powerful and effective. Because the pinch server acts alone, he is free to show off his talent, which he wouldn't have been able to do so as a setter. After the timeskip, Semi is a musician/civil servant.

 Hayato Yamagata, #14 

 is a third year student at Shiratorizawa Academy, and is a libero for the volleyball team.

 Taichi Kawanishi, #12 

 is a second-year student at Shiratorizawa Academy and is a middle blocker for the volleyball team. He was able to stop Karasuno's synchronized attack. It is also shown that he and Shirabu are close friends.

Inarizaki High School
 is a high school located in the Hyōgo Prefecture of Kansai region. The inari (稲荷) in the school name uses the same kanji as Inari Ōkami, the Shinto deity of foxes; thus, they are often represented with foxes and torii. The team is highly popular and fan favorites for winning Nationals, and are supported by their strong lineup, particularly the Miya twins, Atsumu Miya and Miya Osamu. Inarizaki has a large marching band, orchestra, and cheer team at their games. They have a passionate fanbase known for booing at opposing teams. Their uniforms are black and white, and their school banner says "we don't need the memories", alluding to their highly competitive nature.

 Shinsuke Kita, #1 
 (Japanese); Kevin D. Thelwell (English)
 is a third-year student at Inarizaki High School. He is a wing spiker and the captain of his volleyball team. Kita has been raised since childhood by his grandma with the belief that “the gods are always watching” and as a result is calm, collected, and polite, to the point that his teammates feel he is more robot than human. He is not an exceptional player like his teammates are, but his strength comes from his ability to maintain calm even in the most stressful situations. Up until his third year of high school, Kita never played in an official match and did not even receive a uniform in his middle school years. Upon being named captain of Inarizaki, he showed a rare moment of emotion and cried tears of joy. As a captain, Kita is extremely thoughtful and considerate with his teammates, watching them closely and often giving them blunt feedback and advice. For this reason, his teammates are somewhat scared of him. As of 2020, he runs a rice farm.

 Ren Ōmimi, #2 
 (Japanese); Joe Daniels (English)
  is a third-year at Inarizaki High School, and a middle blocker. He is a very tall and skilled blocker. Shoyo Hinata nicknamed him the “scary-looking guy”.

 Aran Ojiro, #4 
  (Japanese); Camryn Nunley (English)
  is a third-year student and wing spiker. He is the ace of Inarizaki and regarded as one of the top 5 best high school spikers in Japan. He is shown to be very mature and is good friends with the whole team. He has been playing volleyball for a long time and has known the Miya twins since they were kids, who admired his volleyball skills and his foreign-sounding name. In the timeskip, he plays for both the Tachibana Red Falcons as well as the JNT (along with Atsumu and Suna).

 Hitoshi Ginjima, #5 
 (Japanese); Dano Colon (English)
  is a second-year student in Inarizaki High School, and a wing spiker. He is shown to be a very skilled spiker who is good friends with his teammates.

 Atsumu Miya, #7  
 (Japanese); Blake Jackson (English)
  is a second-year student and the team's setter. He is the older twin brother of Osamu Miya, who nicknames him “Tsumu” or ( sumu in the manga ). He is first shown when Tobio Kageyama meets him during the All-Japan Youth training camp, where he demonstrates exceptional skills as a player. He calls Kageyama a “goodie-two-shoes” due to his tendency to always accommodate his spikers and never be demanding with his sets, which is the opposite of how Atsumu acts as a setter. Though talented and dedicated to volleyball, Atsumu is immature and demanding, which often puts him at odds with his teammates. Atsumu is also a feared player for his serving abilities; he is able to make use of a powerful jump serve as well as a jump float serve. Despite their usual petty fights, he and Osamu have extremely good chemistry on the court, to the point that they're able to sometimes switch positions and to perfectly recreate Shoyo Hinata and Kageyama's quick attack in the midst of a match. Currently, he is part of the MSBY Black Jackals.

 Rintarō Suna, #10 
 (Japanese); Howard Wang (English)
  is a second-year student and a middle blocker. Despite being relatively short for a middle blocker, he is an extremely powerful and peculiar player due to his ability to spike the ball using his whole torso. This technique gives him a larger spiking range and makes his attacks difficult to block. Having been recruited from Aichi prefecture, he is the only player on the Inarizaki team that does not speak in a Kansai dialect. Like Kei Tsukishima, he is an intelligent blocker with an aloof personality, often ridiculing the twins for their antics.

 Osamu Miya, #11  
 (Japanese); Daman Mills (English)
  is a second-year student at Inarizaki High School, and a wing spiker for the volleyball team. He is the younger twin brother of Atsumu Miya, who nicknames him “Samu”. Osamu is more collected and laidback than his twin and appears to care more about how his teammates perceive him. He and Atsumu often get into petty fights, but on the court they have incredible chemistry, being one of Inarizaki's main strengths as a team. Osamu now runs his own onigiri'' shop. (In 2020)

Yūto Kosaku, #13 

  is a second-year student and a wing spiker.

Heisuke Riseki, #14 
  is a first-year student in Inarizaki High School, and a wing spiker.

Michinari Akagi, #15 
 (Japanese); Jason Duga (English)
  is a third-year student and the libero of the volleyball team.

Itachiyama Institute
 is a high school in Tokyo, the “itachi” (鼬) in their name means “weasel”, which is their animal representative, although not officially confirmed. Their ace, Kiyoomi Sakusa, is one of the top 3 in Japan, and their libero, Motoya Komori, is the number one high school libero in the nation. Their uniforms are bright yellow, green, white and black. In Shoyo Hinata's third year at Karasuno, they played against Itachiyama.

Tsukasa Iizuna, #1 
 is a third-year at Itachiyama Institute. He is the setter and the captain of the team.

Kiyoomi Sakusa, #10  

  is a second-year student at Itachiyama Institute. He is a wing spiker and the ace of the volleyball team, being  the top ace of Japan. He's the cousin of Motoya Komori. He is mentioned many times in the series, but is first briefly introduced when his team wins against Fukurodani at the Tokyo qualifiers, earning the first spot as Tokyo representative at Nationals, and later when he attends the All-Youth Japan Training Camp with Tobio Kageyama. He appears to be a very calm, mature, and quiet person, who doesn't get affected by lost matches. His power as a spiker comes from his extremely flexible wrists that allow him to spike the ball wherever he wants and control its direction. He has an aversion to crowds, wears a face mask when not on the court, and is obsessed with hygiene. After the timeskip, Sakusa is part of the MSBY Black Jackals. He joins the JNT and continues to play with MSBY as of recent.

Motoya Komori, #13 

  is a second-year student at Itachiyama Institute, and the libero for the volleyball team. He is the cousin of Kiyoomi Sakusa, but unlike the latter, he has a more friendly and energetic personality. He is considered the top high school libero in Japan and is also invited with his cousin to the All-Youth Japan Training Camp.

Kamomedai High School
 is a high school located in Nagano Prefecture. The “kamome” in their name means “seagull”, which is their animal representative and also a reference to their ability of “being able to fly in any condition”. They are a very powerful team, who focuses especially on serving, blocking and have extreme mental toughness. They're able to maintain concentration in any situation and never get affected by the other teams or by their mistakes. They are also considered one of the best blockers in the nation, specializing in “read blocking”. Keishin Ukai states that their blocking is even more powerful than Date Tech. Their uniforms are blue and white and their banner says “habit is second nature”.

Kōrai Hoshiumi, #5 
Voiced by: Natsuki Hanae (Japanese); Tyler Galindo (English)
  is a second-year student at Kamomedai High. He is a wing spiker and ace for his volleyball team. He is first introduced when Tobio Kageyama meets him at the All-Youth Japan Training Camp. He comes from a family of tall people but he has inherited a short stature from his mother, and just like Shoyo Hinata he has always been underestimated because of his height. When he is first introduced he is about as tall as Hinata, so he has an ongoing rivalry with him, where they both compete to earn the next "Little Giant" title. He is loud and rather proud and can get easily irritated, especially when people are not impressed by his skills as an ace. After the timeskip, he plays with the Schweiden Adlers.

Sachirō Hirugami, #6 
Voiced by: Yū Miyazaki (Japanese); Michael Wronski (English)
  is a second-year student at Kamomedai High, and a middle blocker for the volleyball team. He and Hoshiumi have known each other since middle school, where they played in the volleyball team and have been close friends ever since then. He comes from a family of accomplished volleyball players so he has always had a natural talent for the sport, starting to play when he was very young. However this has always put a lot of pressure on him since he was a kid, and Hirugami tended to be a perfectionist and was hardly ever satisfied with his playing, to the point where he continued to blame himself for every little mistake. It is only after talking to Hoshiumi and realizing that quitting volleyball was an option that he started to take the sport less seriously and stopped focusing too much on his mistake.

Other characters

Yui Michimiya 

 is the captain of girls' volleyball team at Karasuno High School; she is a third-year student. Friends with Daichi Sawamura since middle school. Like Daichi, she is also a wing spiker. She is also known to have a crush on Daichi, although he is completely unaware of it.

Saeko Tanaka 

 is Ryūnosuke Tanaka's energetic older sister and a college student. She takes Shoyo Hinata and Tobio Kageyama to their training camp in Tokyo after they finish their make-up exams. She watches Karasuno High's official games after that. Appearance-wise, she resembles her brother. She is also a member of a team of Wadaiko drummers.

Ikkei Ukai, "Ukai Sr." 

 is Keishin Ukai's grandfather who used to coach Karasuno's volleyball team until he was hospitalized, now teaches little kids volleyball. He had a friendly rivalry with Nekomata. He was known as a strict coach. Later he spends time teaching Shoyo Hinata and comes to see a couple of Karasuno's official games.

Akiteru Tsukishima 

 is Kei Tsukishima's brother, who is in college and also plays volleyball. Kei looked up to his brother who used to be his team's ace when in middle school. But after joining Karasuno in high school, because there were better players, including the Little Giant, Akiteru is not even included in the team's substitute players lineup, let alone the starting players. He is distraught when Kei finds this out, but continues to play volleyball when he goes to college, since he feels he was unable to prove anything in high school. He comes to watch his brother play even though Kei mostly dislikes it. He also gives him tips regarding volleyball and also asks Kei to practice with his college team so that he gets practice playing against bigger players.

Nobuteru Irihata 

 is the coach/advisor of the Aoba Josai High volleyball team. He lets the players think and come up with strategies, choosing only to offer advice when they are having trouble coming up with anything themselves. During their first practice match against Karasuno, he comments on Karasuno's team being full of holes, but still strong. He also comments that Tobio Kageyama is able to play well only because he is in Karasuno, and it might not have been the same case anywhere else.

Takurō Oiwake 

 is the coach/advisor of the Date Tech High volleyball team.

Yasufumi Nekomata 

 is the coach/advisor of the Nekoma High volleyball team. Having met Ikkei Ukai in his youth, he sparked a friendly rivalry with the other and, upon becoming coaches, both men sought to have their teams compete against one another in an official match. In the series, Nekomata has recently returned as Nekoma's coach and is in contact with Ittetsu Takeda; as a result, he orchestrates practice matches with the Karasuno team and invites them to the summer training camp.

Tanji Washijō 

 is the coach/advisor of the Shiratorizawa Academy volleyball team. Being of a short stature himself, he believes that power will always win, and follows the same principle in building his team. He is a strict coach, who gives spartan training to his team of chosen players. He dislikes coach Keishin Ukai's idea of always bringing in new things. He begins showing a strange interest in Shoyo Hinata after their match. He helps sponsor Hinata's visit to Brazil and has high expectations for him.

Yūsuke Takinoue 

 is an alumnus of Karasuno's volleyball team. He and Shimada are part of the Karasuno Neighborhood Association and both come to watch Karasuno High's games. He works at Takinoue Electronics.

Makoto Shimada 

 is an alumnus of Karasuno's volleyball team. He and Takinoue are part of the Karasuno Neighborhood Association and both come to watch Karasuno High's games. He works at Shimada Mart. Tadashi Yamaguchi learns how the "jump float" serves from him after seeing him use the technique in their practice match.

Natsu Hinata 

 is Shoyo Hinata's younger sister.

Alisa Haiba 

 is Lev Haiba's older sister. After the timeskip, she models with her younger brother.

Miwa Kageyama 
 is Tobio Kageyama's older sister. She is only shown in the manga (so far).

Yūji Terushima 

 is the captain of Johzenji, another school.

References

Haikyu!!
Haikyu!!